The 1998 Miami RedHawks football team was an American football team that represented Miami University during the 1998 NCAA Division I-A football season. In their ninth season under head coach Randy Walker, the RedHawks finished in a tie for first place in the East Division of the Mid-American Conference (MAC), compiled a 10–1 record (7–1 against MAC opponents), and outscored all opponents by a combined total of 317 to 142.  The team's sole loss came against MAC champion Marshall by a 31–17 score.

The team's statistical leaders included Mike Bath with 1,500 passing yards, Travis Prentice with 1,787 rushing yards, and Trevor Gaylor with 653 receiving yards.

Schedule

References

Miami
Miami RedHawks football seasons
Miami RedHawks football